Autophylla is a genus of moths in the family Geometridae.

Species
 Autophylla pallida Warren, 1894

References
 Autophylla at Markku Savela's Lepidoptera and Some Other Life Forms

Ennominae
Geometridae genera